The Squirrel River is a river in Oneida County, Wisconsin, which arises in Squirrel Lake and empties into the Tomahawk River a few miles upstream from the Willow Reservoir.  The Squirrel River was an important part of a trade and travel route for Indians and non-Indians in the fur trade era.  Using canoes in the summer and dog sleds in the winter, travelers would use the river, Squirrel Lake, and a short land portage to travel between Lac du Flambeau and the Tomahawk River.  The Tomahawk River, connecting with the Wisconsin River, formed one long north-south route.

The Squirrel River travels through the Squirrel River Pines State Natural Area, a 363-acre stand of mostly large red pines (Pinus resinosa).  The recreation area is managed by the Wisconsin Department of Natural Resources.

References

External links

Rivers of Wisconsin
Rivers of Oneida County, Wisconsin